Green Planet may refer to:

 E.T.: The Book of the Green Planet, a 1985 novel and sequel to E.T. the Extra-Terrestrial
 The Queen's Green Planet, a 2018 documentary with David Attenborough at Buckingham Palace Garden  
 Surviving Mars: Green Planet, a 2019 expansion pack for the video game Surviving Mars
 The Green Planet (TV series), a 2022 nature documentary series presented by David Attenborough
 Green Planet Energy, a German electric utility